The 1962–63 European Cup was the eighth season of the European Cup, a football competition for European clubs. The competition was won by Milan, who beat two-time defending champions Benfica in the final at Wembley Stadium in London. Milan's victory was the first by an Italian club.

Albania entered its champion for the first time this season.

Bracket

Preliminary round

|}

1 Feyenoord beat Servette 3–1 in a play–off to qualify for the first round.

Note: Benfica and Stade Reims received byes.

First leg

Second leg

Milan won 14–0 on aggregate.

Ipswich won 14–1 on aggregate.

Galatasaray won 4–1 on aggregate.

Polonia Bytom won 6–2 on aggregate.

CSKA Red Flag won 6–2 on aggregate.

Anderlecht won 4–3 on aggregate.

Sporting CP won 7–1 on aggregate.

Dundee won 8–5 on aggregate.

Servette 4–4 Feyenoord on aggregate.

Feyenoord won 3–1 in play-off match.

Vasas won 11–1 on aggregate.

Austria Wien won 7–3 on aggregate.

Dukla Prague won 4–0 on aggregate.

Esbjerg won 2–1 on aggregate.

Norrköping won 3–1 on aggregate.

First round

|}

1 Feyenoord beat Vasas 1–0 in a playoff to qualify for the quarter-finals.

First leg

Second leg

Milan won 4–2 on aggregate.

Galatasaray won 4–2 on aggregate.

Anderlecht won 4–2 on aggregate.

Dundee won 4–2 on aggregate.

Feyenoord 3–3 Vasas on aggregate.

Feyenoord won 1–0 in play-off match.

Stade Reims won 7–3 on aggregate.

Dukla Prague won 5–0 on aggregate.

Benfica won 6–2 on aggregate.

Quarter-finals

|}

First leg

Second leg

Milan won 8–1 on aggregate.

Dundee won 6–2 on aggregate.

Feyenoord won 2–1 on aggregate.

Benfica won 2–1 on aggregate.

Semi-finals

|}

First leg

Second leg

Milan won 5–2 on aggregate.

Benfica won 3–1 on aggregate.

Final

Top scorers

Notes and references

External links
European Champions Clubs' Cup 1962–63 All matches – season UEFA.com

1962–63 in European football
European Champion Clubs' Cup seasons